Europe 2009 is a live album and video release by the Dave Matthews Band from several 2009 concerts in Italy and London.  The concert on the three CDs was held in Piazza Napoleone in Lucca, Italy, on July 5, 2009.  The concert featured on the DVD was at Brixton Academy in London, on June 26, 2009. Tim Reynolds, who resumed touring with the band in 2008, appears on both the audio discs and the DVD.

CD track listing - Live from Lucca

Disc one
"Don't Drink the Water" (Dave Matthews) –  
"Shake Me Like a Monkey" (Carter Beauford/Stefan Lessard/Matthews/LeRoi Moore/Rashawn Ross/Boyd Tinsley) –  
"You Might Die Trying" (Dave Matthews Band/Mark Batson) –  
"Seven" (Beauford/Lessard/Matthews/Moore/Ross/Tinsley) –  
"Funny the Way It Is" (Beauford/Lessard/Matthews/Moore/Ross/Tinsley) –  
"So Damn Lucky" (Stephen Harris/Matthews) –  
"Everyday" (Glen Ballard/Matthews) –  
"Crash into Me" (Matthews) –

Disc two
"#41" (Dave Matthews Band) –  
"Spaceman" (Beauford/Lessard/Matthews) –  
"Corn Bread" (Matthews/Batson) –  
"Lying in the Hands of God" (Beauford/Lessard/Matthews/Moore/Ross/Tinsley) –  
"Jimi Thing" (Matthews) –  
"Why I Am" (Beauford/Lessard/Matthews/Moore/Ross/Tinsley) –  
"The Dreaming Tree" (Harris/Matthews) –

Disc three
"Alligator Pie" (Beauford/Lessard/Matthews) –  
"Ants Marching" (Matthews) –  
"Gravedigger" (Matthews) –  
"Dive In" (Beauford/Matthews) –  
"Two Step" (Matthews) –  
"Rye Whiskey" (Traditional) –  
"Pantala Naga Pampa" (Matthews) – 
"Rapunzel" (Beauford/Lessard/Matthews) –

DVD track listing - Across the Pond 
Intro
"Don't Drink the Water" (Matthews)
"Squirm" (Beauford/Matthews)
"So Damn Lucky" (Harris/Matthews)
"Shake Me Like a Monkey" (Beauford/Lessard/Matthews/Moore/Ross/Tinsley)
"Crash into Me" (Matthews)
"Funny the Way It Is" (Beauford/Lessard/Matthews/Moore/Ross/Tinsley)
"So Much to Say" (Peter Griesar/Matthews/Tinsley)
"Anyone Seen the Bridge?" (Dave Matthews Band)
"Lie in Our Graves" (Dave Matthews Band)
"Seven" (Beauford/Lessard/Matthews/Moore/Ross/Tinsley)
"Why I Am" (Beauford/Lessard/Matthews/Moore/Ross/Tinsley)
"#41" (Dave Matthews Band)
"You & Me" (Matthews)
"Lying in the Hands of God" (Beauford/Lessard/Matthews/Moore/Ross/Tinsley)
"All Along the Watchtower" (Bob Dylan)
"Gravedigger" (Matthews)
"Alligator Pie" (Beauford/Lessard/Matthews)
"Tripping Billies" (Matthews)
End Credits

Bonus Tracks

"Dive In" (Beauford/Matthews)
"Time Bomb" (Matthews)
"Spaceman" (Beauford/Lessard/Matthews)
"Two Step" (Matthews)

Personnel
Dave Matthews Band
Carter Beauford – drums, percussion, backing vocals
Stefan Lessard – bass guitar
Dave Matthews – guitars, lead vocals
Boyd Tinsley – violins, backing vocals

Additional musicians
Jeff Coffin – saxophones
Tim Reynolds – electric guitars
Rashawn Ross – trumpet, backing vocals

Technical
 Joe Lawlor – engineer
 Jeff "Bagby" Thomas – live sound engineer
 Jonathan Russell – mastering at Masterfonics
 Chris Kress – mixing at PMD Recording
 Danielle Warman – mixing assistant (Stereo, Surround and post-mix)
 Jon Altschiller – mixing (Stereo, Surround and post-mix)

Chart performance

References 

2009 video albums
Dave Matthews Band live albums
Dave Matthews Band video albums
Live video albums
2009 live albums
RCA Records live albums
RCA Records video albums
Albums recorded at the Brixton Academy